Yala Technical College is a higher education institution in Yala, Thailand offering two year (full-time) post-secondary diplomas in information technology, computer engineering, architecture, mechanical engineering, construction engineering, rubber technology, electrical engineering, electronics engineering, automotive engineering, and business information systems.
The college also offers a 2+2 years programme in technical education.

References

External links 
 www.ytc.ac.th

Educational institutions established in 1957
Vocational colleges in Thailand
1957 establishments in Thailand